Michael Schulze may refer to:

 Michael Schulze (Australian footballer) (born 1962), Australian rules footballer
 Michael Schulze (footballer, born 1989), German footballer